E. Sampathkumar (born 10 June 1936) is a professor emeritus of graph theory from University of Mysore. He has contributed to domination number, bipartite double cover, and reconstruction theory, as well as other areas of graph theory. He was chairman of the department of mathematics of the Karnataka university, Dharwar and the University of Mysore (1992–95).

Born and raised in Mallur village, Channapatna Taluk, Ramanagaram (District), outside of Bangalore, he earned a M.Sc. (1955) in mathematics from Central College of Bangalore University, and a Ph.D. (1965) in mathematics (Some studies in Boolean algebra) from the Karnataka University, Dharwar. He was a lecturer at the department of mathematics Karnatak College, Dharwar (1960–65), and then professor at the department of mathematics, Karnatak University, Dharwar (1966–1988).
After retiring in 1996 from Mysore University (1989–96), he has been working for the Department of Science and Technology (India) as a principal investigator on several projects in graph theory. He was head at DOS in Mathematics, University of Mysore (1992–1995).

Contributions
Professor E. Sampathkumar is the first one in India to teach Graph Theory as a subject in any of the Indian universities. He introduced it as a special paper in 1970-71 for MSc Mathematics students at Karnatak University, Dharwad. Per Google Scholar, his H-index is 21 and he has over 1500 citations. Since 2005, his birthday, June 10, is celebrated as Graph Theory day in India.

References

Kannada people
Graph theorists
1936 births
Living people
Academic staff of the University of Mysore
Academic staff of Karnatak University
Scientists from Karnataka
Bangalore University alumni
People from Ramanagara district
20th-century Indian mathematicians
Indian combinatorialists